Mab-21 domain containing 2 is a protein in humans that is encoded by the MB21D2 gene.

References

Further reading 

Genes on human chromosome 3